"I Want to Be in Love" is a 2001 Melissa Etheridge song and the first single from her seventh album, Skin.

Music video 
The video starred the actress Jennifer Aniston as the girl in the party who comes across several characters. The director of the video clip is David Hogan.

Awards

Charts

References 

2001 singles
Melissa Etheridge songs
Songs written by Melissa Etheridge
Music videos directed by David Hogan
2001 songs
Island Records singles